The Comic Strip Live is the oldest stand-up comedy showcase club in New York City, located at 1568 Second Avenue (between 81st and 82nd Streets).

History
The Comic Strip was opened in 1976. Richard Tienken and Robert Wachs were two of the club's founders. Before emerging as a venue spotlighting only stand up comedians, the club originally featured singers, magicians, and novelty acts. Chris Rock used to stack chairs to get stage time and Colin Quinn was a bartender at the club.

In 2017 Jerry Seinfeld returned to the club to shoot his Netflix special, “Jerry Before Seinfeld"; he had first performed at the club in 1976. Adam Sandler also shot part of his 2018 special “100% Fresh” at the club.

Present
Primarily a showcase club, the Comic Strip encourages performers to consistently write, perform and perfect new material. Once a year, the club holds an "Audition Lottery", where aspiring newcomers line up to be given a date to try out their routine on "Audition Night". If they do well, the club's talent booker passes them. "Passing" means getting a chance to work late night, where they perfect their acts. This occurs weeknights after the regular show has ended.

Guinness World Record
From June 3, 2008 through June 5 the Comic Strip Live broke the Guinness World Record for the Longest Continuous Stand Up Comedy Show, finishing at slightly beyond the 50-hour mark. The entire event was hosted by William Stephenson and included performances by Dave Attell, Judah Friedlander, Ted Alexandro, Tony Rock, Jeffrey Ross, Mike Birbiglia, Judy Gold, Rich Vos, and Greg Giraldo.

Notable alumni

 Ted Alexandro
 Dan Allen
 Aziz Ansari
 Dave Attell
 Ben Bailey
 Greer Barnes
 Charlie Barnett
 D. C. Benny
 Mike Birbiglia
 Scott Blakeman
 Vinnie Brand
 Kevin Brennan
 Jim Breuer
 Eddie Brill
 Jimmy Brogan
 Louis C.K.
 Bryan Callen
 Mario Cantone
 George Carlin
 Dave Chappelle
 Dane Cook
 Tom Cotter
 Sunda Croonquist
 Rodney Dangerfield
 Ellen DeGeneres
 Ray Ellin
 Susie Essman
 Jimmy Fallon
 Wayne Federman
 Christian Finnegan
 Judah Friedlander
 Jim Gaffigan
 Elon Gold
 Judy Gold
 Bobcat Goldthwait
 Gilbert Gottfried
 Darrell Hammond
 J. R. Havlan
 John Henson
 Vanessa Hollingshead
 Cory Kahaney
 Artie Lange
 Carol Leifer
 Kerri Louise
 Bill Maher
 Jackie Martling
 Dennis Miller
 Larry Miller
 Eddie Murphy
 Dan Naturman
 Kevin Nealon
 Big Jay Oakerson
 Patton Oswalt
 Rick Overton
 Joe Piscopo
 Richard Pryor
 Colin Quinn
 Paul Reiser
 Caroline Rhea
 Chris Rock
 Tony Rock
 Seth Rogen
 Ray Romano
 Jeffrey Ross
 Angel Salazar 
 Adam Sandler
 Steven Scott
 Jerry Seinfeld
 Rick Shapiro 
 Sarah Silverman 
 Spanky
 Jon Stewart
 Jeff Stilson
 Wanda Sykes
 George Wallace
 Damon Wayans
 Robin Williams
 Dennis Wolfberg

Notes
Fox Broadcasting Company had an unrelated late-night stand-up comedy showcase, Comic Strip Live, which aired in the late 1980s and into the early 1990s. The club changed its name from "The Comic Strip" to "Comic Strip Live" in an apparent attempt to capitalize on this.

References

External links
 
 

Comedy clubs in Manhattan
Upper East Side